Inside the Whale and Other Essays is a book of essays written by George Orwell in 1940. It includes the eponymous essay "Inside the Whale".

Background
Inside the Whale was published by Victor Gollancz as a book of essays on 11 March 1940. Orwell refers to it as a "book" in part three of the essay. ("While I have been writing this book another European war has broken out."), as well as in letters he wrote to Geoffrey Gorer and Humphry House, an English scholar, the following month. Gollancz initially printed 1,100 copies in March 1940, with some copies destroyed by Nazi bombing of England.

Contents
"Inside the Whale" (1939)
"Charles Dickens" (1940)
"Boys' Weeklies" (1940)

Later version
A collection of essays with the same title was published in 1962 in the UK by Penguin Books. This edition was a reprint of an earlier collection entitled "Selected Essays" published in 1957. The collection contains the following essays:

"Inside the Whale"
"Down the Mine" (a passage from The Road to Wigan Pier)
"England Your England"
"Shooting an Elephant"
"Lear, Tolstoy and the Fool"
"Politics vs. Literature: An Examination of Gulliver's Travels"
"Politics and the English Language"
"The Prevention of Literature"
"Boys' Weeklies"

See also
Bibliography of George Orwell

References

External links
 

1940 non-fiction books
Books by George Orwell
English-language books
English essay collections
Victor Gollancz Ltd books
Books of literary criticism